Atopochilus chabanaudi is a species of upside-down catfish endemic to the Republic of the Congo where it occurs in Stanley Pool.  It is consumed for food and is threatened by urbanisation of Stanley Pool, water pollution and lead toxicity which comes from car oil and boat traffic. This species grows to a length of  SL.

Etymology
The catfish is named in honor of ichthyologist-herpetologist Paul Chabanaud (1876-1959), who was Preparator of Fishes, at the Muséum national d’Histoire naturelle in Paris.

References

Endemic fauna of the Republic of the Congo
chabanaudi
Freshwater fish of Africa
Fauna of the Republic of the Congo
Taxa named by Jacques Pellegrin
Fish described in 1938